Epichloë novae-zelandiae is a hybrid asexual species in the fungal genus Epichloë. 

A systemic and seed-transmissible grass symbiont first described in 2019,  Epichloë novae-zelandiae is a natural triploid allopolyploid of Epichloë amarillans, Epichloë bromicola and Epichloë typhina subsp. poae.

Epichloë novae-zelandiae is found in New Zealand, where it has been identified in the grass species Poa matthewsii.

References

novae-zelandiae
Fungi described in 2019
Fungi of New Zealand